Ottaplakkal Neelakandan Velu Kurup (known as O. N. V. Kurup; 27 May 1931 – 13 February 2016) was a Malayalam poet and lyricist from Kerala, India, who won the Jnanpith Award, the highest literary award in India for the year 2007.   He received the awards Padma Shri in 1998 and Padma Vibhushan in 2011, the fourth and second highest civilian honours from the Government of India. In 2007 he was awarded an Honorary Doctorate by University of Kerala, Trivandrum. O. N. V. was known for his leftist leaning. He was a leader of All India Students Federation  (AISF). He died on 13 February 2016 at KIMS hospital in Thiruvananthapuram due to age-related illnesses, aged 84.

Biography
O.N.V Kurup was born to O. N. Krishna Kurup and K. Lakshmikutty Amma, on 27 May 1931 at Chavara, Kollam (Quilon) in Kerala. He lost his father when he was eight. His childhood days were spent in Chavara, where he attended the government school. After graduating with a bachelor's degree in economics from SN College, Kollam, he moved to Thiruvananthapuram city (Trivandrum) where he joined Travancore University (now Kerala University) and pursued Master of Arts in Malayalam literature.

O.N.V. was a lecturer at Maharajas College – Ernakulam, University College – Trivandrum, Arts and Science College – Kozhikode, and Brennen College – Thalassery. He joined Government Women's College – Trivandrum as the Head of Malayalam Department. He was also a visiting professor at Calicut University. He retired from service in 1986.

He received the Jnanpith Award, India's highest literary award, for the year 2007. He was the fifth Jnanpith laureate from Kerala and the second Malayalam poet to win the prestigious award. According to a statement by Bharatiya Jnanpith, the trust which presents the award, Kurup began his career as a "progressive writer and matured into a humanist though he never gave up his commitment to socialist ideology".

He was settled at Vazhuthacaud in Thiruvananthapuram, with his wife Sarojini, who was also his student in his early days. His son Rajeev works with the Indian Railways Authority, and daughter Mayadevi is a noted gynaecologist in Aster Medicity, Cochin. Malayalam playback singer Aparna Rajeev is his granddaughter.

Poetry
O. N. V.'s first published poem was 'Munnottu' (Forward) which appeared in a local weekly in 1946. His first poetry collection, Porutunna Soundaryam, came out in 1949. He published a book named Daahikunna Paanapaathram (The Thirsty Chalice) which was a collection of his early poems during 1946–1956.

Poetic works

*Collection of 1500 songs.  **Poems for children

Prose list

Lyricist
In addition to the valuable contributions, he had given to the Malayalam literature, he was one of the leading lyricists in Malayalam film/drama/album industry. He was the part of many dramas by Kerala People's Arts Club (KPAC) which has a major remark in the revolutionary movements of Kerala. Kalam Marunnu (1956) was his first film which was also the first film by the famous Malayalam composer G. Devarajan. Since then, he has been active in film until his death and was honored with one national award and fourteen state awards (the most by a Malayalee). He has penned about 1000 songs in about 232 films and numerous songs for plays and albums. His partnerships with Salil Chowdhury and M. B. Sreenivasan were so popular in Malayalam film industry. He has made many hit songs with popular music directors, including G. Devarajan, Raveendran, V. Dakshinamoorthy, M. S. Baburaj,  M. K. Arjunan, K. Raghavan, Ilaiyaraaja, Shyam, Johnson, Bombay Ravi, Mohan Sithara, M. G. Radhakrishnan, S. P. Venkatesh, Ouseppachan, Vidyadharan and M. Jayachandran.

Awards

Civilian honours
 2011 – Padma Vibhushan
 2007 – Honorary Doctorate (honoris causa) by University of Kerala
 1998 – Padma Shri

Literary awards
O. N. V. has won numerous awards for his literary works.
 2015 – Kadammanitta Ramakrishnan Award
 2015 – Medal of Pushkin (Медаль Пушкина)
 2013 – P. Kesavadev Literary Award
 2011 – Kamala Surayya Award for Dinantham
 2011 – Thoppil Bhasi Award
 2010 – COSINE Award
 2009 – Ramashramam Trust Award
 2007 – Ezhuthachan Award
 2007 – Jnanpith Award for his overall contributions to Malayalam literature (Announced on 24 September 2010)
 2006 – Vallathol Award
 2003 – Bahrain Keraleeya Samajam Sahitya Award
 2002 – P. Kunhiraman Nair Award for Ee Purathana Kinnaram
 2002 – Deviprasadam Trust Award 
 1993 – Aasan Prize
 1990 – Odakkuzhal Award for Mrigaya
 1982 – Vayalar Award for Uppu                                                                                                                               *1979-Pandalam Keralavarma Janmasathabdi Smaraka Award (Poetry)
 1981 – Soviet Land Nehru Award for Uppu<
 1975 – Kendra Sahitya Akademi Award (Malayalam) for Aksharam
 1971 – Kerala Sahitya Akademi Award (Poetry) for Agni Salabhangal

Film awards
 National Film Awards
 1989 - Best Lyricist – Vaishali

 Kerala State Film Awards

ONV won the Kerala State Film Award for the Best Lyricist fourteen times:
 2016 – Best Lyricist (Film – Kambhoji)
 2008 – Best Lyricist (Film – Gulmohar)
 1990 – Best Lyricist (Film – Radha Madhavam)
 1989 – Best Lyricist (Film – Oru Sayahnathinte Swapnathil, Purappadu)
 1988 – Best Lyricist (Film – Vaishali)
 1987 – Best Lyricist (Film – Manivathoorile Ayiram Sivarathrikal)
 1986 – Best Lyricist (Film – Nakhakshathangal)
 1984 – Best Lyricist (Film – Aksharangal, Ethiripoove Chuvannapoove)
 1983 – Best Lyricist (Film – Adaminte Variyellu)
 1980 – Best Lyricist (Film – Yagam, Ammayum Makkalum)
 1979 – Best Lyricist (Film – Ulkkadal)
 1977 – Best Lyricist (Film – Madanolsavam)
 1976 – Best Lyricist (Film – Survey Kallu)
 1973 – Best Lyricist (Film – Swapnam)

 Filmfare Awards
 2009 – Best Lyricist Award – Pazhassi Raja
 2011 – Best Lyricist Award – Paattil Ee Pattil – (Pranayam)

 Asianet Film Awards
 2001 –  Best Lyricist Award -Meghamalhar
 2002 –  Best Lyricist Award -Ente Hridayatinte Udama

Positions held

Kurup served and headed various office of state and central government organisations. Notably:
 Executive Member, Executive Board of the Sahitya  Akademi, New Delhi from 1982–86.
 Chairman, Kerala Kalamandalam – the State Akademi of Classical performing Arts (1996).
 Fellow of the Kerala Sahitya Academy in 1999.

He also has been the part of various delegation at international events. Some of the notable among them being:
 Visited USSR as member of an Indian Writers Delegation to participate in the 150th birth anniversary of Leo Tolstoy.
 Represented India in the Struga Poetry Evenings, Yugoslavia (1987)
 Attended CISAC Asian Conference in Singapore (1990).
 Visited USA to participate in FOKANA Conference (1993).
 Visited USA to inaugurate literary seminar in Kerala Centre, New York (1995).
 Presented poems on Beethoven and Mozart in the Department of German, University of Bonn.
 Indian delegate to the CISAC World Conference held in Berlin (1998).

Death 
ONV Kurup died on 13 February 2016, due to age-related ailments at KIMS Hospital in Thiruvananthapuram. He was 84. He was cremated with full state honours at Thycaud Santhikavadam crematorium, which was named by him. At the time of his cremation, 84 singers representing the 84 years of his life, led by K. J. Yesudas, paid homage to him by singing his poems and songs. He is survived by his wife, children, grandchildren and great-grandchildren.

See also
 O. N. V. Literary Award

References

External links

O.N.V Kurip Verse List-Tribute
O. N. V. – Master of verse
Swaralaya to honour O. N. V.
Official Website of Information and Public Relation Department of Kerala

1931 births
2016 deaths
People from Kollam district
Writers from Thiruvananthapuram
20th-century Indian poets
Malayalam-language writers
Malayalam poets
Malayalam-language lyricists
Sree Narayana College, Kollam alumni
University College Thiruvananthapuram alumni
Academic staff of the University College Thiruvananthapuram
Recipients of the Jnanpith Award
Recipients of the Padma Vibhushan in literature & education
Recipients of the Padma Shri in literature & education
Recipients of the Sahitya Akademi Award in Malayalam
Recipients of the Kerala Sahitya Akademi Award
Recipients of the Ezhuthachan Award
Kerala State Film Award winners
Filmfare Awards South winners
Academic staff of Maharaja's College, Ernakulam
20th-century Indian musicians
Musicians from Thiruvananthapuram
Film people from Kerala
Indian male songwriters
Indian male poets
Poets from Kerala
20th-century Indian male writers
Best Lyrics National Film Award winners
20th-century male musicians